In the United Kingdom, the Alternative Vote referendum also known as the UK-wide referendum on the Parliamentary voting system was a referendum that took place on 5 May 2011, on whether to change the system for electing the House of Commons, the lower house of the national Parliament at Westminster. In the result of a Yes vote, future United Kingdom general elections would have used the "Alternative Vote" (AV); in the event of a No vote, the voting system would remain the same, with the UK continuing to use the "First Past the Post" (FPTP) voting system. The votes cast in the referendum were first counted in each of 440 districts or electoral divisions across the country (the "local counting areas"), which were then combined and declared at a regional level (the regions being the constituent countries of Wales, Scotland and Northern Ireland, and the regions of England).

Under the provisions of the Parliamentary Voting System and Constituencies Act 2011 there was a total of 440 voting areas across twelve regions using the same boundaries as used in European Parliamentary elections since 1999 under the provisions of the European Parliamentary Elections Act 2002 with the exception of Gibraltar which did not participate in the referendum. In England the 326 local government districts were used as the voting areas; these consist of all unitary authorities, all metropolitan boroughs, all shire districts, the London boroughs, the City of London and the Isles of Scilly. As the date of the plebiscite coincided with elections to the Scottish Parliament, Welsh Assembly and the Northern Ireland Assembly  different arrangements were required for the devolved nations so in Scotland the 73 Scottish Parliamentary constituencies were used as the Scottish counting areas and in Wales the 40 Welsh assembly constituencies were used as the Welsh counting areas and Northern Ireland was a single counting area.

Ballots were due to be verified by 13:00 BST on 6 May 2011 and the votes were counted from 16:00 BST onwards. Both the local and regional results were updated live online via aboutmyvote.co.uk, a publicly accessible website run by the Electoral Commission.

This article lists, by voting area, all the results of the referendum, each ordered into national and regional sections.

United Kingdom
The national result for the whole United Kingdom was announced at the Platinum Suite at the Exhibition Centre London (ExCel) by the Chief counting officer (CCO) and Chair of the Electoral Commission, Jenny Watson, at 01:00 BST on Saturday 7 May 2011 after all 440 voting areas and UK regions had declared their results. With a national turnout of 42% the target to secure the majority win for the winning side was 9,639,512 votes.  The decision by the people who voted was a decisive "No" vote to adopting the alternative vote system in future United Kingdom general elections by a majority of 6,860,516 votes over those who had voted "Yes" in favor of the proposal.

Results by United Kingdom regions

Results by United Kingdom constituent countries

Local results
Of the 440 voting areas, ten returned a majority in favour of the change (Cambridge, Oxford, Glasgow Kelvin, Edinburgh Central, and the London Boroughs of Hackney, Islington, Haringey, Lambeth, Southwark and Camden). The counting area with the highest proportion of AV supporters was the London Borough of Hackney with 60.68% in favour of the change (34.23% turnout) and the lowest proportion was the borough of Castle Point, Essex with 20.29% in favour (41.38% turnout).

England
The English local districts were used as the voting areas for the referendum in England; these consist of all unitary authorities, all metropolitan boroughs, all shire districts, the London boroughs, the City of London and the Isles of Scilly.

The English Regions were also then used to count the votes at the regional level meaning there was no single national count of the votes. All nine regions in England returned huge "No" votes.

East Midlands

The East Midlands region was broken down into 40 voting areas.

East of England

The East of England region was broken down into 47 voting areas.

Greater London

The London region was broken down into 33 voting areas.

North East England

The North East England region was broken down into 12 voting areas.

North West England

The North West England region was broken down into 39 voting areas.

South East England

The South East England region was broken down into 67 voting areas.

South West England

The South West England region was broken down into 37 voting areas.

West Midlands

The West Midlands region was broken down into 30 voting areas.

Yorkshire and the Humber

The Yorkshire and the Humber region was broken down into 21 voting areas.

Northern Ireland
Northern Ireland was a single voting area, as well as being a regional count for the referendum. It was the last region of the United Kingdom to declare its result after major delays due to slow pace of counting and declaring results for the 2011 Northern Ireland Assembly Elections meant that the start of the local count for the referendum could not begin until the evening on Friday 6 May 2011, several hours after counting had started in the rest of the country and the result was not finally known until 1am on Saturday 7 May 2011.

Scotland

The constituencies of the Scottish Parliament were used as the local voting areas for the referendum throughout Scotland.

Scotland was broken down into 73 voting areas.

Wales

The constituencies of the National Assembly for Wales were used as the local voting areas for the referendum throughout Wales.

Note: In Wales under the Welsh Language Act 1993 the Welsh language has equal status with the English language.

Wales was broken down into 40 voting areas.

References

External links
The Electoral Commission Referendum results

2011 referendums
A
Electoral reform in the United Kingdom
A
Election results in the United Kingdom